The Boxing Tournament at the 1986 Central American and Caribbean Games was held in Santiago de los Caballeros, Dominican Republic from June 24 to July 5, 1986.

Medal winners

Medal table

There where 2 bronze medals that where unknown who got them

References
Amateur Boxing

C
1986 Central American and Caribbean Games
Boxing at the Central American and Caribbean Games